Hapoel Kfar Saba is an Israeli women's football club from Kfar Saba competing in the Israeli Second Division and the Israeli Women's Cup.

History
The club was established in 2016, as the activities of Maccabi Kfar Saba was taken over by Hapoel Kfar saba. and entered the league's second division ahead of the 2016–17 season.

References

External links
 Hapoel Kfar Saba  Israeli Football Association 

Women's football clubs in Israel
Association football clubs established in 2016
Sport in Kfar Saba